The Battle and Fall of Przemysl is a 1915 documentary war film shot on the Eastern Front by official war photographer to the Central Powers, Albert K. Dawson. Its four reels depicted the Siege of Przemyśl, disastrous for the Austrians, with incidents reenacted using soldiers as extras. Most of it has been lost.

References

External links
 
 "The Battle and Fall of Przemysl" (USA, 1915) - scenes found at the Austrian Film Archives

1915 documentary films
Black-and-white documentary films
1915 films
Documentary films about World War I
American silent feature films
Lost American films
American documentary films
American black-and-white films
1915 lost films
1910s American films
Silent war films